Unspeakable: The Autobiography is a memoir by the former House of Commons Speaker John Bercow, published by Weidenfeld & Nicolson, on 6 February 2020. It gives an insight as his life as Speaker of the House of Commons and his verdict on British politics.''

Critical reception 
Bercow responded to the Members of Parliament who accused of him of bullying, however the House of Commons staff responded that the MP's having a "right to expect" privacy.

References 

2020 non-fiction books
Political memoirs
Books about British politicians
British non-fiction books
Weidenfeld & Nicolson books